Hear 'n Aid was a charity record recorded by a large ensemble of 40 heavy metal musicians and released in 1986. The project was organized by Ronnie James Dio, Jimmy Bain, and Vivian Campbell, all from the band Dio. Proceeds from the album were used to raise money for famine relief in Africa.

The 40 musicians were gathered together by Dio and recorded the single "Stars" together; the rest of the album was filled out with eight other tracks, several of which were contributed by artists who were on tour and unable to attend and participate in the mass recording session. A music video was released as well, produced during the recording sessions.

Release and reception
Dio originally intended the single and album to be released shortly after its recording, but contractual issues with the different artists' record labels delayed the release until 26 May 1986, somewhat diminishing the impact of its release.

The compilation album titled Hear 'n Aid (or alternatively appearing as Hear 'n Aid (An All-Star Album For Famine Relief))" was headed by "Stars", and included live tracks by Kiss, Motörhead, Dio, Accept, Rush, Scorpions, "Go for the Throat" by Y&T and a studio recording by Jimi Hendrix was released on vinyl and cassette tape formats.

The "Stars" single was released on vinyl in both 7" and 12" versions. The back of the record sleeve for the single had the following description:
"On May 20 and 21, 1985, 40 artists from the hard rock music community gathered at A&M Records Studios to participate in the making of a record called "Stars", as part of a very special project known as Hear 'N Aid. The "Stars" single, coupled with the album, a video documentary on the making of the record, and other ancillary products will raise money for famine relief efforts in Africa and around the world.
40 artists and hundreds of volunteers donated their time and talent over four months to make Hear 'N Aid a reality. "Stars" is a plea for unity in the fight against world hunger."

The following CD release info needs verification as Wendy Dio indicated as late as 2011 that it was only ever released on vinyl and cassette.

The project also released a 30 minute Sony home video documentary, Hear 'n Aid: The Sessions, which was shot during the recording process and released on VHS and Video8 formats. The back cover for the documentary has the following description:

The single "Stars" peaked at No. 26 in the UK Singles Chart in April 1986. The music video for "Stars" received moderate airplay on MTV's Heavy Metal Mania and afterward on MTV's replacement program Headbangers Ball. During the period of high popularity of MySpace, Ronnie James Dio's profile contained an entry crediting the project with having raised $1 million within a year. In a 2017 article written for Classic Rock, Ronnie's wife and manager, Wendy Dio, estimated the project's total amount raised to be over $3 million.

On 31 May 2004, VH1 premiered a five-night documentary special titled "100 Most Metal Moments", narrated by Dee Snider. At the conclusion, Hear 'n Aid was ranked as the "No. 1 Most Metal Moment".

History 
In interview video footage taken during the event, Ronnie said that while attending a 48-hour charity Radiothon at the radio station KLOS, Dio members Jimmy Bain and Vivian Campbell noticed that representation from hard rock or heavy metal stars was low. In light of the success of Band Aid's "Do They Know It's Christmas?" and USA for Africa's "We Are the World", they forwarded the idea to Ronnie James Dio, also attending the Radiothon, and together decided to create a similar project exclusively built around artists from the hard rock/heavy metal scene. Together the three co-wrote the song "Stars".

The song "Stars" was recorded on 20 and 21 May 1985 with the first session at Sound City Studios and then the second session moving to A&M Studios Studio A, where "We Are The World" was recorded. It was edited and mixed at Rumbo Recorders and mastered at Artisan Sound.

The project included contributions from Ted Nugent, Yngwie Malmsteen, Tommy Aldridge and members of Dio, Judas Priest, Iron Maiden, Quiet Riot, Dokken, Mötley Crüe, Twisted Sister, Queensrÿche, Blue Öyster Cult, Vanilla Fudge, Y&T, Rough Cutt, Giuffria, Journey, W.A.S.P. and Night Ranger as well as the parody band Spinal Tap. Lead vocals were shared between Ronnie James Dio, Rob Halford, Kevin DuBrow, Eric Bloom, Geoff Tate, Dave Meniketti, Don Dokken, and Paul Shortino. Vivian Campbell, Carlos Cavazo, Buck Dharma, Brad Gillis, Craig Goldy, George Lynch, Yngwie Malmsteen, Eddie Ojeda, and Neal Schon all added guitar solos. Iron Maiden's Dave Murray and Adrian Smith were in the middle of their 'World Slavery Tour' at the time and flew in to attend the main session.

The non-profit 
Prior to the album release, and indicative of their business acumen and commitment to the project's success, Ronnie, Jimmy and Vivian established Hear 'n Aid as a full fledged non-profit (presumably to avoid experiencing similar missteps and pitfalls encountered with previous African aid efforts). "Hear ’n Aid had to be a non-profit organisation… We had to set up a board of directors, fourteen people, and all decisions had to be made by the board. My role was getting the licensing." - Wendy Dio The Classic Rock article also indicates the project leadership and participants were well aware that the funds raised from similar events such as Band Aid were squandered due to governmental corruption as well as suffering from general disorganization which led to things such as "food rotting on docks" - Paul Shortino (vocalist for Rough Cutt). The funds raised through the Hear 'n Aid project were instead used to purchase and ship agricultural machinery.

The California Articles of Incorporation for HEAR 'N AID, INC. C1364527 as a 501 (c)(3) non-profit were executed in Los Angeles, California on 10 December 1985 and filed on 4 February 1986. The initial 11 directors included Ronnie's wife - Wendy Dio of Niji Management, Curtis Dean Lorrain c/o Current Productions, Paul Newman of Tasco Video, Martin H. Rogol c/o USA For Africa, Michon C. Stanco of W3 Public Relations, Patricia A. Wicker of Niji Management, Michael T. Brokaw of Kragan & Company, James Stewart Bain of Niji Management, Vivian Patrick Campbell of Niji Management, Ronnie James Dio of Niji Management, and Sharon Weisz of W3 Public Relations. These 11 directors are also credited in the IMDb as having various jobs in the Hear 'n Aid: The Sessions documentary.

 Wendy Dio - board of directors / consultant
 Curt Lorraine - transportation coordinator/board of directors
 Paul Newman - executive producer
 Marty Rogol - board of directors
 Michon Stanco - board of directors / production assistant
 Patty Wicker - board of directors / production assistant
 Michael Brokaw - board of directors/consultant
 Jimmy Bain - board of directors
 Vivian Campbell - board of directors
 Ronnie James Dio - board of directors
 Sharon Weisz - board of directors / consultant / talent coordinator

The non-profit containing all 11 original directors was wound up, assets were distributed and was dissolved 21 June 1991.

Track listing

Charts

Personnel

Track 1: "Stars" 
Hear 'n Aid

Lead vocals
Eric Bloom (Blue Öyster Cult)
Ronnie James Dio (Dio)
Don Dokken (Dokken)
Kevin DuBrow (Quiet Riot)
Rob Halford (Judas Priest)
Dave Meniketti (Y&T)
Paul Shortino (Rough Cutt)
Geoff Tate (Queensrÿche)

Backing vocals
Tommy Aldridge (Ozzy Osbourne)
Dave Alford (Rough Cutt)
Carmine Appice (Vanilla Fudge/King Kobra)
Vinny Appice (Dio)
Jimmy Bain (Dio)
Frankie Banali (Quiet Riot)
Mick Brown (Dokken)
Vivian Campbell (Dio)
Carlos Cavazo (Quiet Riot)
Amir Derakh (Rough Cutt)
Buck Dharma (Blue Öyster Cult)
Brad Gillis (Night Ranger)
Craig Goldy (Giuffria)
Chris Hager (Rough Cutt)
Chris Holmes (W.A.S.P.)
Blackie Lawless (W.A.S.P.)
George Lynch (Dokken)
Yngwie Malmsteen
Mick Mars (Mötley Crüe)
Michael McKean (in character, and credited as David St. Hubbins of Spinal Tap)
Vince Neil (Mötley Crüe)
Ted Nugent
Eddie Ojeda (Twisted Sister)
Jeff Pilson (Dokken)
Rudy Sarzo (Quiet Riot)
Claude Schnell (Dio)
Neal Schon (Journey)
Harry Shearer (in character, and credited as Derek Smalls of Spinal Tap)
Mark Stein (Vanilla Fudge)
Matt Thorr (Rough Cutt)

Lead guitar solos

1st solo: 
 Craig Goldy (Giuffria)
 Eddie Ojeda (Twisted Sister)

2nd solo:
 Vivian Campbell (Dio)
 Brad Gillis (Night Ranger)

3rd solo:
 Neal Schon (Journey)
 George Lynch (Dokken)

4th solo:
 Yngwie Malmsteen
 Vivian Campbell (Dio)

5th solo:
 George Lynch (Dokken)
 Carlos Cavazo (Quiet Riot)

6th solo:
 Brad Gillis (Night Ranger)
 Buck Dharma (Blue Öyster Cult)

Rhythm guitar melody lines
Dave Murray (Iron Maiden)
Adrian Smith (Iron Maiden)

Bass
Jimmy Bain (Dio)

Drums
Vinny Appice (Dio)
Frankie Banali (Quiet Riot)

Keyboards
Claude Schnell (Dio)

Track 2: "Up to the Limit" 
Accept
 Vocals - Udo Dirkschneider
 Guitars - Wolf Hoffmann
 Guitars - Jörg Fischer
 Bass guitar - Peter Baltes
 Drums - Stefan Kaufmann

Track 3: "On the Road" 
Mötorhead 
 Vocals, bass guitar - Lemmy Kilmister
 Rhythm guitar - Phil "Wizzö" Campbell
 Lead guitar - Michael "Würzel" Burston
 Drums - Pete Gill

Track 4: "Distant Early Warning" 
Rush
 Bass and rhythm guitar, vocals, synthesizers, and bass pedal synthesizer - Geddy Lee
 Electric and acoustic guitars, and bass pedal synthesizer - Alex Lifeson
 Drums and percussion - Neil Peart

Track 5: "Heaven's on Fire" 
Kiss
 Rhythm guitar, lead vocals - Paul Stanley
 Bass guitar, lead vocals - Gene Simmons 
 Drums, backing vocals - Eric Carr
 Lead guitar - Bruce Kulick

Track 6: "Can You See Me" 
The Jimi Hendrix Experience
 Guitar, lead vocals - Jimi Hendrix
 Bass guitar - Noel Redding
 Drums - Mitch Mitchell

Track 7: "Hungry for Heaven" 
Dio
 Vocals - Ronnie James Dio
 Guitar - Vivian Campbell
 Bass guitar - Jimmy Bain
 Drums - Vinny Appice
 Keyboards - Claude Schnell

Track 8: "Go for the Throat" 
Y&T
 Lead vocals, lead guitar - Dave Meniketti
 Rhythm guitar, backing vocals - Joey Alves
 Bass guitar, backing vocals - Phil Kennemore
 Drums, backing vocals - Leonard Haze

Track 9: "The Zoo" 
Scorpions
 Lead vocals - Klaus Meine
 Lead guitar, voice-box, backing vocals - Matthias Jabs
 Rhythm guitar, backing vocals - Rudolf Schenker
 Bass guitar, backing vocals - Francis Buchholz
 Drums, percussion, backing vocals - Herman Rarebell

Re-issue and potential sequel
There was a second planned song to benefit a charity that Dio was involved with for years ("Children of the Night"), that benefited runaway children. This was to be a song called "Throw Away Children". However, due to various reasons the project never materialized, and the song ended up appearing on the 2002 Dio album, Killing the Dragon.

On 2 November 2011, Dio's widow Wendy announced that the song "Stars" would be re-released. She told Rolling Stone: “I’m going to re-release [Stars] because it only ever came out on vinyl and cassette. So it’ll come out on DVD and CD, I have loads of outtakes for the video”.

On 30 March 2015, Wendy Dio spoke with Eddie Trunk on his SiriusXM satellite radio show Eddie Trunk Live. "We are in talks right now with a couple of record labels to reissue HEAR 'N AID, with the funds going to [the Ronnie James Dio] Stand Up And Shout [Cancer Fund, the charity founded in memory of the late singer]". "We have so much stuff that was never released before — behind-the-scenes stuff that was shot during the whole time. We have photos galore of everybody that was involved in it, and I think it'll be fantastic. We just have to work on it. It may not come out this year, because I want everything to be perfect, as Ronnie would want it to be, but I am in talks about it, and that will be coming out, definitely."

In April 2015, Wendy Dio confirmed that a modern-day version of Hear 'n Aid was in the works to record a "new song" and released alongside the upcoming reissue of "Stars". She had stated that "legal stuff" was the cause of the reissue delay.

References

External links 
 Hear 'n Aid: The Sessions 1986 30 minute music documentary footage gleaned from the recording sessions.
 Hear 'n Aid: The Sessions.
 Rate Your Music (RYM) Rating for Stars single. (3.43/5.00)
 Rate Your Music (RYM) Rating for Hear 'n Aid Album. (3.58/5.00)
 Additional information on Hear 'N Aid releases including photos
 - Video (YouTube.com).

Musical advocacy groups
Heavy metal concerts
All-star recordings
Charity supergroups